Alfold is the name of an English village in Surrey.
Alfold Crossways, nearby

Alföld is also the name of the Hungarian parts of the Pannonian Plain:
Great Alföld (also known as Alföld or the Great Hungarian Plain)
Little Alföld (also known as the Little Hungarian Plain)

See also
Alford (disambiguation)